The cercle de l'Union interalliée, also known as the Cercle interallié, is a private social and dining club established in 1917. The clubhouse is the Hôtel Perrinet de Jars at 33 rue du Faubourg Saint-Honoré in Paris, France. It adjoins the British Embassy and an annex of the embassy of Japan.

The club's second president was Ferdinand Foch, Marshal of France, Field Marshal of the United Kingdom, Marshal of Poland and supreme commander of the Allies of World War I. The club includes royalty and political figures among its international members.

History

The Union Interalliée was founded in 1917, at the time of the official American entry into World War I. This was after the voluntary aviators from the Lafayette Escadrille had come to France to increase the number of those who were fighting for the same cause on French soil.

The founders of the Union Interalliée (the Count of Beaumont, Paul Dupuy, the Count J. de Bryas, Arthur Meyer, MJ of Sillac) suggested establishing a place of welcome providing moral and material resources to the officers and personalities of the Allied nations, in order to develop the allied life that had just begun.

Thanks to the support they received from several statesmen, ambassadors and field marshals and the assistance from new collaborators (Count of Andigne, Bardac, du Breuil Saint-Germain, André Citroën, L. Dumontet, the Count of Fels, who created, along with the former, the directing committee, chaired by Vice Admiral Fournier), they founded the Union Interalliée in one of the most beautiful mansions in Paris, the hotel Henri de Rothschild, which had been generously offered to them. In 1920, the club, having set up a real estate company, acquired the building for the equivalent of today's €1,067,143.

The war having ended, the need for the Union Interalliée was apparent to everybody, as it was more necessary than ever to maintain harmony between the people who had fought together. The work that had begun in 1917 received an official consecration in 1920 when the public authorities recognized its importance in diplomatic relations between the allied nations. On 1 June 1920, Marshal Foch became the second president of the Cercle.

In 2004, Chilean-born American interior designer Juan Pablo Molyneux designed the interiors of the clubhouse.

Club founders in 1917
Count Marc de Beaumont 
Marquis de Bryas
Paul Dupuy
Arthur Meyer
Jean de Sillac
Count d'Andigné
S. Barbac
Mr. du Breuil de Saint-Germain
André Citroën
Léon Dumontet
Count Edmond de Fels
Vice-admiral Fournier

Presidents of the club
1917-1920 : Vice-Admiral Fournier
1920-1928 : Marshal of France Ferdinand Foch
1928-1935 : Jules Cambon
1935-1937 : Former President of France Gaston Doumergue
1938-1942 : Charles-Louis de Beauvau-Craon
1942-1953 : Admiral Marie-Jean-Lucien Lacaze
1953-1959 : Count Stanislas de Castellane
1959-1975 : Prince Jean-Louis de Faucigny-Lucinge
1975-1999 : Count Jean de Beaumont
1999-2009 : Pierre-Christian Taittinger
since 2009 : Count Denis de Kergorlay

Notable members

Alain Juppé
Jean-Charles de Castelbajac
Valéry Giscard d'Estaing
André Citroën
Nadine de Rothschild
Maréchal Foch
Jules Cambon
Gaston Doumergue
Hélène Carrère d'Encausse
HRH Prince Jean of Luxembourg, Prince of Nassau
Sir Li Ka-shing

Reciprocal clubs in the world
There are a number of reciprocal clubs worldwide including:
Australia : Tasmanian Club;Australian Club, Sydney; Melbourne Club; Athenaeum Club, Melbourne
Belgium : Cercle Royal Gaulois
Canada : Royal Canadian Yacht Club; Vancouver Club; Mount Royal Club; Royal Canadian Military Institute
Colombia : Gun Club; Jockey Club
England : Royal Automobile Club; The Arts Club; Carlton Club; East India Club; The Hurlingham Club; National Liberal Club; Naval & Military Club; Oxford and Cambridge Club; Reform Club; Savage Club; Cavalry and Guards Club; Royal Air Force Club
Finland : Helsinki Bourse Club
Germany : Industrie-Club, Düsseldorf; International Club Berlin, IC-B, Berlin; Übersee-Club e.V., Hamburg
Hong Kong : Hong Kong Club, American Club of Hong Kong
Italy : Circolo Canottieri Aniene, Rome; Circolo Artistico Tunnel, Genova; Circolo Bellini, Palermo; Circolo dell'Unione, Venezia;
Japan : Tokyo American Club
Kenya : Muthaiga Country Club
Netherland: Sociëteit De Witte
Peru: Club Nacional
Portugal : Club Portuense
Singapore : Tanglin Club
South Africa : The Cape Town Club
Spain: Sociedad Bilbaina, Bilbao. Circulo Ecuestre, Barcelona.Real Gran Peña, Madrid
Sweden : The Royal Bachelors' Club, Nya Sällskapet, Stockholm
Switzerland : Club Baur au Lac, Grande Société de Berne
Turkey : Circle D'orient
United States : Harmonie Club of New York City, Army Navy Club of Washington, DC; Cosmos Club; Delaware Dining Society; Francisca Club, San Francisco; Harvard Club of Boston; Jonathan Club, Los Angeles; Los Angeles Athletic Club; Racquet Club of Philadelphia; Rainier Club, Seattle; Somerset Club, Boston; Standard Club of Chicago; Sulgrave Club, Washington, D.C.; Union Club of Boston; University Club of San Francisco; University Club of St. Louis; University Club of Washington, DC Metropolitan Club, San Francisco, CA; Algonquin Club, Boston, MA; Yale Club of New York City, New York City; Century Association, New York City; Metropolitan Club, Washington, DC.

References

External links

 Official website

Clubs and societies in France
Dining clubs
1917 establishments in France